State Highway 34 (SH-34) is a state highway serving Franklin and Caribou counties in southeastern Idaho. The highway runs northeasterly along the Bear River from Preston towards Soda Springs and the Wyoming state line, where it terminates and becomes Wyoming Highway 239.

The entire highway is designated as the Pioneer Historic Byway, a National Scenic Byway following a historic pioneer route. The designation continues south on U.S. Route 91 through Preston and Franklin towards the Utah state line.

Route description

State Highway 34 begins north of downtown Preston at an intersection with U.S. Route 91. The highway, temporarily concurrent with State Highway 36, travels north from Preston through the communities of Thatcher and Grace, following the course of the Bear River. North of Grace, State Highway 34 intersects U.S. Route 30 and becomes concurrent with the highway while continuing east into Soda Springs. From Soda Spring, the highway continues north towards the Blackfoot Reservoir and Grays Lake National Wildlife Refuge, turning east to cross the Caribou Mountains. State Highway 34 ends at the Wyoming state line north of Freedom, where Wyoming Highway 239 begins its short route to U.S. Route 89.

History

The Bear Lake–Caribou Scenic Route was designated as a state scenic byway in December 1988.

Major intersections

See also

 List of state highways in Idaho
 List of highways numbered 34

References

External links

034
Transportation in Franklin County, Idaho
Transportation in Caribou County, Idaho